Cicadettini is a tribe of cicadas in the family Cicadidae. There are at least 110 genera and 520 described species in Cicadettini, found worldwide except for the Neotropics.

Selected Genera
 Adelia Moulds, 2012
 Amphipsalta Fleming, 1969
 Cicadetta Kolenati, 1857  (type genus)
 Cicadettana Marshall & Hill, 2017
 Diemeniana Distant, 1906
 Euboeana Gogala, Trilar & Drosopoulos, 2011
 Ewartia Moulds, 2012
 Galanga Moulds, 2012
 Huechys Amyot & Audinet-Serville, 1843
 Kanakia Distant, 1892
 Kikihia Dugdale, 1972
 Maoricicada Dugdale, 1972
 Notopsalta Dugdale, 1972
 Oligoglena Horvath, 1912
 Punia Moulds, 2012
 Rhodopsalta Dugdale, 1972
 Saticula Stål, 1866
 Simona Moulds, 2012
 Yoyetta Moulds, 2012

See also
 List of Cicadettini genera

References

Further reading

External links

 

 
Cicadettinae